Blackstone's Fancy is a 1973 historical thriller novel by the British writer Derek Lambert, published under the pen name Richard Falkirk. It is the second in a series of novels featuring Edmund Blackstone, a member of the Bow Street Runners in the pre-Victorian era. Blackstone gets mixed up in the world of prizefighting.

References

Bibliography
 Frankie Y. Bailey. Out of the Woodpile: Black Characters in Crime and Detective Fiction. ABC-CLIO, 1991.

1973 British novels
Novels by Derek Lambert 
British historical novels
British thriller novels
Novels set in London
Novels set in the 1820s
Novels about boxing
Methuen Publishing books